Full service or Full Service may refer to:

 Full-service radio, a wide range of programming
 Full Service Network, a communications company

Entertainment
 "Full Service", a song by the New Kids on the Block from their album The Block
 Full Service (band), an Austin-based band
 Full Service (book), a 2012 memoir by Scotty Bowers
 Full Service, a 2005 novel by Will Weaver
 Full Service No Waiting, a 1998 album by Peter Case

Other meanings 
 A level of hospitality or comprehensiveness
 An airline with a traditional service level, as opposed to a low-cost carrier
 A full-service restaurant, where waiters take food orders from customers seated at tables
 A hotel that offers full standardized industry amenities
 A car wash where attendants wash the interior as well as the exterior of vehicles
 A filling station that pumps fuel, washes windshields and checks vehicle fluid levels
 A rest area that offers a gas station, food, rest rooms and other amenities for travelers
 A law firm that offers legal services in a variety of areas of law
 A code word or euphemism for prostitution